Tunnel vision is the loss of peripheral vision with retention of central vision, resulting in a constricted circular tunnel-like field of vision.

Causes 
Tunnel vision can be caused by:

Eyeglass users
Eyeglass users experience tunnel vision to varying degrees due to the corrective lens only providing a small area of proper focus, with the rest of the field of view beyond the lenses being unfocused and blurry. Where a naturally sighted person only needs to move their eyes to see an object far to the side or far down, the eyeglass wearer may need to move their whole head to point the eyeglasses towards the target object.

The eyeglass frame also blocks the view of the world with a thin opaque boundary separating the lens area from the rest of the field of view. The eyeglass frame is capable of obscuring small objects and details in the peripheral field.

Mask, goggle, and helmet users

Activities which require a protective mask, safety goggles, or fully enclosing protective helmet can also result in an experience approximating tunnel vision. Underwater diving masks using a single flat transparent lens usually have the lens surface several centimeters from the eyes. The lens is typically enclosed with an opaque black rubber sealing shell to keep out water. For this type of mask the peripheral field of the diver is extremely limited. Generally, the peripheral field of a diving mask is improved if the lenses are as close to the eye as possible, or if the lenses are large, multi-window, or is a curved wrap-around design.

Protective helmets such as a welding helmet restrict vision to an extremely small slot or hole, with no peripheral perception at all. This is done out of necessity so that ultraviolet radiation emitted from the welding arc does not damage the welder's eyes due to reflections off shiny objects in the peripheral field.

Optical instruments 
Binoculars, telescopes, and microscopes induce an experience of extreme tunnel vision due to the design of the optical components.

A wide field microscope or telescope generally requires much larger diameter and thicker lenses, or complex parabolic mirror assemblies, either of which results in significantly greater cost for construction of the optical device.

Wide-field binoculars are possible, but require bulkier, heavier, and more complex eyepieces. The diameter of the objective lenses is unimportant for field of view. The widest-angle eyepieces used in telescopes are so large that two would not fit side-by-side for use in binoculars.

See also
Target fixation, a psychological phenomenon where a person at the controls of a vehicle risks inadvertently colliding with a specific object as a result of intensely focusing on it.

References

External links 

Vision
Blindness
Metaphors